The Stewards' Cup was a greyhound competition held annually. 

It was inaugurated in 1941  and a different venue was chosen each year by the National Greyhound Racing Club over the standard distance of the relevant track (and much later the stayers distance).

From 1981 until 1987 the competition was held at Brighton and was for British Bred greyhounds only. The following year the competition found a permanent home at Walthamstow Stadium. 

The event ended in 2008 following the closure of Walthamstow.

Past winners

References

Greyhound racing competitions in the United Kingdom
Recurring sporting events established in 1941